Joffre Peak is a  mountain summit located in the Coast Mountains, in Joffre Lakes Provincial Park, in southwestern British Columbia, Canada. It is the second-highest point of the Joffre Group, which is a subset of the Lillooet Ranges. The nearest higher peak is Mount Matier,  to the south. The mountain's climate supports the Matier Glacier on the southwest slope, and the Anniversary Glacier on the southeast slope. Precipitation runoff from the peak drains into Joffre Creek and Cayoosh Creek which are both within the Fraser River watershed.

History
The first ascent of the mountain was made on July 19, 1957 by Dick Chambers and Paddy Sherman, who were members of the British Columbia Mountaineering Club. The first ascent party named this peak for its position at the head of Joffre Creek. The creek and mountain's name honors Marshal Joseph Jacques Césaire Joffre (1852–1931), a French general who served as Commander-in-Chief of French Armies in World War I. The mountain's toponym was officially adopted June 22, 1967, by the Geographical Names Board of Canada. Joffre Peak should not be confused with Mount Joffre in the Canadian Rockies which is also named for the same person.

Climate

Based on the Köppen climate classification, Joffre Peak is located in a subarctic climate zone of western North America. Most weather fronts originate in the Pacific Ocean, and travel east toward the Coast Mountains where they are forced upward by the range (Orographic lift), causing them to drop their moisture in the form of rain or snowfall. As a result, the Coast Mountains experience high precipitation, especially during the winter months in the form of snowfall. Winter temperatures can drop below −20 °C with wind chill factors below −30 °C. The months July through September offer the most favorable weather for climbing Joffre Peak.

Climbing Routes
Established climbing routes on Joffre Peak:
   
 Southeast Face -  First ascent 1957
 Southwest Gully -  FA 1971
 East Ridge -  FA 1980

See also

 Geography of British Columbia
 Geology of British Columbia

Gallery

References

External links
 Climbing Joffre Peak: YouTube
 Joffre Peak weather: Mountain Forecast
 2019 Landslides: CBC News

Mountains of British Columbia
Pacific Ranges
Two-thousanders of British Columbia
Coast Mountains
Lillooet Land District